For the Freedom of the Nation is a 1920 Czechoslovak romantic war drama film directed by Václav Binovec. The film, set during World War I, stars V. Ch. Vladimírov and Suzanne Marwille. Several leading Czech politicians of the period made cameo appearances as themselves in the film, including Karel Kramář. The film premiered on 28 October 1920.

Plot
After the announcement of conscription in 1914, student Jiří Voldán is drafted into the Austro-Hungarian army to fight against Russia. He switches allegiance to the Russians and is wounded in battle. While recovering at a hospital in Kiev he meets the Slovak nurse Maryša, who has fled from the Hungarian authorities, and they fall in love. He recovers and joins the Czechoslovak legions. He fights in Italy and France before being arrested by the Austrians and is sentenced to death, but is freed by friends.

Cast
V. Ch. Vladimírov as Jirí Voldán
Suzanne Marwille as Maryša
Evzen Georgij Jevgenev as 1st Lieutenant Szabo
Marie Ptáková as Jirí's Mother
Václav Vydra as von Bühren
Ladislav H. Struna as Misko
Jan W. Speerger as Miner / Jan Hus
Václav Kubásek as Kubík
Zanka as a Russian commandant
Alois Tichý as a volunteer
Václav Zatíranda as a volunteer
Frantisek Marek as a volunteer
Jaroslav Svára as a volunteer
Karel Votruba as a volunteer
Václav Rapp as a volunteer

Release and reception
The film premiered on October 28, 1920. The author Adolf Branald describes the film as "a patriotic montage about the legionnaires' struggles for freedom", stating that the director was particularly fond of the script and the romance that develops between the characters of Voldán and Maryša. Gian Piero Brunetta cites the film as one of the notable films of the era documenting the Czech experience of World War I, including Rudolf Mesták's Legionář (Legionnaire) (1920), Antonín Vojtěchovský's Jménem jeho Veličenstva  (In the Name of His Majesty) (1928), and Svatopluk Innemann's Plukovník Svec (Colonel Svec) (1930). The film was described as being an "authentic" one. One Czech film history book notes a scene in which several prominent historic Czech figures appear before the soldiers on Christmas Day, including Jan Hus and Jan Žižka. Another publication notes a scene in which a Jewish housekeeper from Halič is crucified.

References

External links

filmovyprehled.cz (in Czech)

1920 romantic drama films
1920 war films
Czech black-and-white films
Czech silent films
Czechoslovak drama films
Czechoslovak black-and-white films
Films directed by Václav Binovec
Silent drama films